Lichtensteig railway station is a railway station in Lichtensteig, in the Swiss canton of St. Gallen. It sits at the junction of the Bodensee–Toggenburg railway and Wil–Ebnat-Kappel railway and is served by local trains only. It is an example of a Keilbahnhof.

Services 
Lichtensteig is served by three services of the St. Gallen S-Bahn:

 : hourly service over the Bodensee–Toggenburg railway between Nesslau-Neu St. Johann and Altstätten SG.
 : hourly service over the Bodensee–Toggenburg railway via Sargans (circular operation).
 : half-hourly service over the Wil–Ebnat-Kappel railway between Wattwil and Wil.

References

External links 
 
 Lichtensteig station on SBB

Railway stations in the canton of St. Gallen
Südostbahn stations